Cape Horn is an unincorporated community in Placer County, California.

References

Unincorporated communities in Placer County, California
Colfax, California
Unincorporated communities in California